"Sixteen" is a song recorded by American country music singer Thomas Rhett. He wrote the song with Sean Douglas and Joe Spargur, and co-produced it with Dann Huff and Jesse Frasure. It is the fifth single from Rhett's third studio album, Life Changes.

Content
The song is a look at biographical milestones in the male narrator's life, focusing particularly on those occurring at the age of sixteen, eighteen, twenty-one and twenty-five. In each verse, the narrator is at a certain point in his life, wishing to be slightly older. Rhett said that he wrote the song when he was 25, and that it was one of the first he wrote for the Life Changes album. He also said that it was integral to the formation of the album, telling The Boot that "It was the first one that I really fell in love with. Then, I started to get in a room with [my co-writers for the album], and we really just started to shape Life Changes around all these different vibes, to make sure it was all really cohesive but every song still sounded fresh."

Commercial performance
The song reached number one on Billboards Country Airplay chart dated January 26, 2019. It has sold 108,000 copies in the United States as of March 2019.

Charts

Weekly charts

Year-end charts

Certifications

References

2017 songs
2018 singles
Thomas Rhett songs
Songs written by Thomas Rhett
Songs written by Joe London
Songs written by Sean Douglas (songwriter)
Song recordings produced by Dann Huff
Big Machine Records singles